Kenco Group, or Kenco, is a privately held Chattanooga, TN-based company that provides logistics services. Kenco specializes in distribution and fulfillment, transportation management, material handling services, and warehouse real estate management. The company is known for being the largest woman-owned third party logistics company in the United States. Its headquarters is located in Chattanooga, Tennessee.

History 
Kenco was founded in August 1950 by Jim Kennedy Jr. and Sam Smartt under the name Cherokee Warehouses. Cherokee Warehouses owned a single 100,000 square-foot warehouse in Chattanooga, Tennessee. Cherokee Warehouses became Kenco with the signing of its first dedicated contract warehousing arrangement with Dupont in 1967.

As of 2015, Kenco was managing over 30 million square feet of warehouse space in North America.

In June 2017, Kenco announced that Denis Reilly will succeed Jane Kennedy Greene as president and chief executive officer. Jane Kennedy Greene will remain chairwoman of the board of directors. Denis Reilly was previously the chief executive officer of St. George Logistics.

In October 2022, Pritzker Private Capital announced an agreement to invest in Kenco Group

Business 
Kenco also provides value-added services including network optimization, sequencing, raw materials management, product testing, vendor-managed inventory, and regulated pharmaceutical destruction. Kenco is certified as a woman-owned business under the WBENC.

Kenco is divided into 5 areas of business:

Kenco Management Services 
Kenco Management Services provides an audit structure for all programs across the Kenco family of companies. It focuses on 6 key functional areas: Safety, Quality Management, Engineering, Human Resources, Information Technology, and Finance.

Kenco Logistics Services
Kenco Logistics Services is Kenco's largest business segment. It provides distribution and fulfillment services for supply chain operations. In 2016 Kenco was ranked by Armstrong & Associates as a Top 50 U.S Third-Party Logistics Provider.

Kenco Transportation Services
Kenco Transportation consists of dedicated fleets and asset based fleets for LTL and TL. Services also include transportation management system software, freight brokerage, carrier selection, audit, and regulatory services. Kenco was ranked No. 26 in Transport Topics Top 50 List in 2017 and manages more than $100 million in transportation revenue.

Kenco Material Handling Solutions 
Originally established as a forklift dealership, Kenco's Material Handling Solutions division now sells material handling equipment from three regional dealerships across the United States. The material handling division also provides technicians for repairs and maintenance. Fleet management provides MHE data and service ticket auditing. As of 2017, Kenco Material Handling Solutions managed $300 million in MHE assets.

JDK Real Estate 
Kenco's real estate segment provides services for business looking to procure warehousing facilities.

Innovation Lab 
The Innovation Lab at Kenco was founded in 2015 to identify, research, and prototype ideas and processes. It has worked with vendors, customers, and entrepreneurs from a number of industries to assist customers with logistics issues. In late 2016, Kenco announced its partnership with Locatible, a location tracking website used in North American distribution centers. In 2017 it partnered with a mobile app vendor to design LoadProof, a mobile web application that can give users supply chain information on their smart devices. It is currently exploring the use of drones for its warehouse operations, partnering with PINC Solutions to deploy an aerial sensor platform and supply chain drone. They have also indicated that they are pursuing research in robotics, augmented reality, wearables, and 3D printing.  In May 2017, it sponsored a study with the University of Tennessee, Knoxville's Global Supply Chain Institute identifying five technologies that companies should examine to ensure their survival in the supply chain industry.

Awards and recognition 
From 2013 - 2017, Kenco has been recognized as a Top 10 Logistics Provider by readers of Inbound Logistics Magazine. Inbound Logistics has also recognized Kenco as one of its G75, a curated list of 75 green supply chain partners, from 2011 - 2017. Kenco was named one of Food Logistics 2017 Top Green Providers and one of their 2017 Top 3PL and Cold Storage Providers. In 2017, Kenco was featured in Global Trade Magazine as one of America's 100 Leading 3PLs.

Through the National Association of Board of Pharmacy, Kenco is a verified-accredited wholesale distributor.

References

Notes

General references

Logistics companies of the United States
Warehouses
Business services companies established in 1950
Transport companies established in 1950
1950 establishments in Tennessee
Companies based in Chattanooga, Tennessee
Transportation companies based in Tennessee